"America Drinks & Goes Home" is a song written by Frank Zappa and recorded in November 1966 and released in 1967 on the Mothers of Invention album Absolutely Free.

The song actually appears in two different versions on the album at the beginning of side 2 under the title "America Drinks" and finishing at the end of side 2 under the title "America Drinks & Goes Home".

In between these songs is a sequence containing "Status Back Baby", "Uncle Bernie's Farm", "Son of Suzy Creamcheese" and "Brown Shoes Don't Make It".  Zappa's title for the entire piece was "Suite No. 2: The M.O.I. American Pageant (2nd in a Series of Underground Oratorios)".  The piece was performed many times during the Mothers of Invention residency at the Garrick Theater in Greenwich Village in New York City during 1967.

Zappa wrote the song to parody his experiences playing with drunken lounge music bands in the early 1960s. The song combines a trite love song lyric with an equally clichéd melody. Zappa also described the ii–V–I progression chord changes in this song as a "satire" of Jazz chord changes in that they go in unexpected or "wrong" directions.

The members of The Mothers perform the song in a very sloppy way on purpose. Sound effects were creatively added to the recording to give it an authentic nightclub feel. An audience member calls out, "I wanna hear Caravan with a drum solo!" At the end of the recording the audience sounds devolve into screams as lead vocalist Ray Collins says good night to the audience and tells them to "drink it up, folks."

Soon after the song was released in early 1967 a few other songs appeared which used very similar ideas such as "On with the Show" by The Rolling Stones (released in 1967), "My Friend" by Jimi Hendrix (recorded in 1968, released in 1971) and "You Know My Name (Look Up the Number)" by The Beatles (recorded in 1967 and 1969, released in 1970.)

References

1967 songs
American songs
Experimental rock songs
Frank Zappa songs
Songs written by Frank Zappa
Songs about the United States